"Here It Comes" is a song by the English band Strawbs. It did not appear on any of their studio albums, but it was included on two compilation albums: Strawbs by Choice and Halcyon Days. Written by bandleader Dave Cousins, "Here It Comes" shows definite pop influences and a more commercial view to song-writing, a trait that would extend to the next single, "Lay Down".

B-Side

The B-side track "Tomorrow" is taken from the Grave New World album and is a band composition, although the main lyrical idea is Dave Cousins's and stems from the feelings Cousins had at the decision taken by Rick Wakeman to leave the band at the end of recording the previous album From the Witchwood.

Personnel

Dave Cousins – lead vocals, acoustic guitar
Tony Hooper – backing vocals, acoustic guitar, percussion
John Ford – backing vocals, bass guitar
Richard Hudson – backing vocals, drums, percussion
Blue Weaver – keyboards

Release history

External links
Lyrics to "Here it Comes" at Strawbsweb official site
Lyrics to "Tomorrow" at Strawbsweb official site

References
 "Here it Comes" at Strawbsweb

1972 singles
Strawbs songs
1972 songs
Songs written by Dave Cousins